Reinoud I van Brederode (English: Raynald) (Santpoort, 1336–1390) was the 6th lord of Brederode.

Life
He was a son of Dirk III van Brederode and Beatrix van Heinsberg van Valkenberg. In 1358 Reinoud was appointed bailiff of Kennemerland by Albert I, count of Holland. In the same year an assassination attempt was made on him at Castricumerzand. On 11 November 1377 he succeeded his father as lord of Brederode. Reinoud supported Machteld of Guelders in her struggle for the county of Guelders from 1371 to 1379.

Family

Reinoud married in 1366 with Jolanda van Gennep van der Eem, a daughter of Jan II van Gennep. They had at least four children:

Dirk or Diederik (1370–1415), who decided to enter a monastic life in 1390, upon which his titles went to his brothers. He spent his life in a Carthusian monastery near Arnhem.
Jan I van Brederode (1370/72–1415), 7th lord of Brederode, married Johanna van Abcoude. They both entered a monastic life in 1402, causing his younger brother to inherit the title of van Brederode.
Walraven I van Brederode (1370/73–1417), 8th lord of Brederode, succeeded his older brother when he entered a monastic life.
William van Brederode, an admiral who offered his services mostly to the Hook faction.

References
 Genealogie der Heren van Brederode, Yearbook CBG, part XII 1959, blz. 105
 Johannes a Leydis, Opusculum de gestis regalium abbatum monasterii sancti Athalberti ordinis sancti Benedicti in Egmonda (written between 1477 and 1484).
 Willem Procurator, (translated by M. Gumbert-Hepp; J.P. Gumbert (ed.), Kroniek. Hilversum, Publisher Verloren, 2001

1336 births
1390 deaths
Reinoud 01
People from Velsen
14th-century people of the Holy Roman Empire